Nilkanth Temple or Imarat-i-Dilkhusha (the heart-pleasing abode) is a Mughal architecture temple built on the orders of Mughal Emperor Akbar by the governor of Mandu, Shah Badgah in 1574 AD. This temple was built for the chief and favorite consort of Akbar, Empress Mariam-uz-Zamani, who was a follower of Hinduism.

The temple is dedicated to Lord Shiva and is a popular Hindu pilgrimage site. It is surrounded by dense valleys and is adjacent to the mountain ranges of Nilkanth valleys.

Background
The Nilkanth palace was built by the Mughal governor of Mandu, Shah Badgah in 1574 AD for the Mughal Empress Mariam-uz-Zamani, the favorite wife of Akbar, who in popular culture is known as Jodha Bai.

This palace was built adjacent to the ancient shrine of Lord Shiva and encompasses the shrine itself.

The name recorded of this palace in the Imperial Mughal documents is  'Imarat-i-Dilkhusha'  (the heart-pleasing abode).
It became the favorite retreat place of the eldest surviving son of Emperor Akbar and Empress Mariam-uz-Zamani, Jahangir.

Legend

According to Hindu sacred texts, the name Nilkanth came into the association with Lord Shiva after he consumed Halahala, a mythical poison from the sea.

It goes back to the story of a fight between Asuras (Demon) and Devas (God) for the possession of Amrith (the immortality nectar). In order to attain the nectar, the Samudra (ocean) needed to be churned and for this purpose, a Mandara mountain was used as churning mettle and Vasuki (king of snakes) was used as a rope tied around the mountain.

Both the Devas and Asuras started to churn the ocean by pulling the rope to their respective end. As the process proceeded, many harmful things started to surface before Amrith. Amongst these was a poison named Halahala. If the legends are to be believed, Halahala came from the mouth of Vasuki as he was pulled from either side.

This poison was so poisonous that it is believed to have the power to destroy the entire creation (Brahamand). Fearing its deadly strength, both the Asuras and Devas prayed to Lord Shiva for aid. Lord Shiva, known as Bhole Shankar for his compassion came to their aid and decided to drink the poison.

Lord Shiva amassed the poison in his throat for preventing the poison to seep into his entire body. A legend proclaims that when Lordess Parvati learnt that her husband, Lord Shiva had consumed the Halahala, she ran to his support and held his throat to stop the poison from running down to his stomach. The impact of the poison was so grave that it turned Lord Shiva's neck blue and hence he came to be known by the name Neelkantha or The Blue-Throated one.

History
The present structure was built on an ancient shrine of Lord Shiva. The original name of the building survived through the last three centuries despite the Mughal character and architecture of the palace, as the palace temple co-existed. After the destruction of the temples during the invasions through the 12th and 13th centuries, this structure was externally made to appear like a Mughal building through the reign of Akbar, however, it encompassed both the palace and the temple (ancient shrine). Now it is simply used as a temple and is a pilgrimage site for the devotees throughout India.

In 1617, as noted by Jahangir in Tuzk-e-Jahangiri, he celebrated his birthday with his mother in this palace of hers, fondly calling it as Imarat-i-Dilkhusha (the heart-pleasing abode).

References

External links
Nilkanth Temple Palace of Mughal Emperor Akbar's Hindu wife, Mariam-uz-Zamani in Madhya Pradesh

Mariam-uz-Zamani
Akbar
Mughal architecture